Soi Cowboy is a short (150 meter long) street in Bangkok, Thailand, with some 40, mostly go-go bars. It caters mainly to tourists and expatriates. Soi Cowboy contains one of the three largest groups of foreign-oriented bars in Bangkok, the other two being Patpong and Soi Nana Tai.

Description
Soi Cowboy is near Sukhumvit Road, between Asok Montri Road (Soi Sukhumvit 21) and Soi Sukhumvit 23, within walking distance from the BTS Skytrain's Asok Station and the Bangkok MRT's Sukhumvit Station. The Pullman Bangkok Grande Sukhumvit Hotel is nearby.

The go-go bars follow the pattern common in Thailand: alcoholic drinks are served and women in bikinis dance on a stage. There is topless or even nude dancing.

History

The first bar opened in Soi Cowboy in the early 1970s, but it was not until 1977 that a second bar opened on the street by T. G. "Cowboy" Edwards, a retired American airman. Edwards got his nickname because he often wore a cowboy hat and the soi was given its name in reference to him by longtime nightlife columnist Bernard Trink. The number of bars grew to 31 by the end of the century, all located on the ground floor.

When Prime Minister Thaksin Shinawatra was elected in 2001, his government instituted a "social order" campaign. As part of this, all bars, nightclubs and restaurants had to close by 02:00, later changed to 01:00 for all areas not officially designated as "entertainment zones". (Unlike Patpong, Soi Cowboy and Nana Plaza were not so designated). A mandatory midnight closing time was even discussed.

Over the years this policy has eased, and some Soi Cowboy bars stay open as late as 02:00.

At their entrance, all go-go bars carry government-mandated signs in Thai and English. The sign reads:

NO-ONE INSIDE
UNDER 20 YEARS
DRUG-FREE

In popular culture
In 2000, the Norwegian group Getaway People released a song called "Soi Cowboy" about the area. The American rock band Sun City Girls included a song called "Soi Cowboy" on their 1996 album 330,003 Crossdressers From Beyond The Rig Veda. In the albums booklet it is said to be based on a traditional melody.

Actor Hugh Grant visited Soi Cowboy in December 2003, while shooting the movie Bridget Jones: The Edge of Reason. The Tilac Bar and several Soi Cowboy bar girls are seen in the film. The Sun wrote on 23 December 2003 that Grant was chased by bar girls and had to flee, though this apparently was untrue.

Two 1-hour episodes of the British comedy/drama Auf Wiedersehen, Pet were shot in Bangkok in the summer of 2004, partly in Soi Cowboy.

In August 2006, scenes were shot in Soi Cowboy for the film Bangkok Dangerous.

In December 2010, scenes for the film The Hangover Part 2 were also shot here, with one of the bars being temporarily renamed for the film.

Soi Cowboy is referenced in the song One Night in Bangkok by Murray Head.

References

External links

 Soi Cowboy Bars Photo Guide
 Videos of Soi Cowboy: Google Video, YouTube
 List of Bars at Soi Cowboy (archived copy from 2015)
 Soi Cowboy nightlife

Streets in Bangkok
Tourist attractions in Bangkok
Red-light districts in Thailand
Watthana district